Maternidade is a Portuguese medical drama television series broadcast by RTP. It has two seasons, the first with 13 episodes and the second with 26 episodes. It originally aired from 30 January 2011 to 23 February 2013 on RTP1.

Cast
Lúcia Moniz
José Fidalgo
Patrícia Bull
Martinho da Silva
Joaquim Horta
Isabel Figueira
Alexandre de Sousa
Custódia Gallego
Alda Gomes
José Mata
Fernando Pires
Cláudia Semedo
Adriane Garcia
Miguel Costa
Miguel Damião
Rita Blanco

References

External links

Portuguese-language television shows
2011 Portuguese television series debuts
Medical television series
Rádio e Televisão de Portugal original programming
2010s Portuguese television series